Joshua Bailey (born October 2, 1989) is a Canadian professional ice hockey winger and alternate captain for the New York Islanders of the National Hockey League (NHL). He was selected ninth overall by the Islanders in the 2008 NHL Entry Draft and has remained with the organization since.

Playing career

Amateur and junior
Bailey grew up in Clarington, Ontario, playing AAA for the Clarington Toros of the Ontario Minor Hockey Association's (OMHA) Eastern AAA League. He was drafted in the first round of the Ontario Hockey League (OHL) priority selection by the Owen Sound Attack in May 2005. He was traded by the Attack to the Windsor Spitfires during the 2006–07 season.

Professional

Bailey was selected ninth overall by the New York Islanders in the 2008 NHL Entry Draft. The Islanders' General Manager Garth Snow traded down twice in the draft (from fifth to seventh, and seventh to ninth) to acquire Bailey. On October 2, 2008, his 19th birthday, the Islanders signed Bailey to a three-year, $900,000 contract.

Shortly after on October 7, 2008, the team announced that Bailey would begin the 2008–09 season with the team in the NHL, but his debut was delayed by an injury sustained during a preseason game. He scored his first goal in the league on January 2, 2009, against Ilya Bryzgalov of the Phoenix Coyotes.

After a strong start to the 2010–11 season, he was injured; upon returning, he had no points in a 13-game stretch, prompting the Islanders to send Bailey to their American Hockey League (AHL) affiliate, the Bridgeport Sound Tigers, in late November after Bailey had played 159 games in the NHL, one game before Bailey would have had to clear waivers to be sent down to the AHL, which starts at 160 NHL games. Bailey played 11 games in the AHL and scored six goals and 11 assists before being brought back up to play with the Islanders again.

With the 2012–13 NHL lockout in effect, Bailey was signed to a temporary lockout contract with German second division club SC Bietigheim Steelers on November 9, 2012. Bailey accumulated 11 points in six games with the Steelers before returning to North America. The Islanders announced on January 15, 2013, that they had suspended Bailey due to sustaining an injury while playing for the Steelers, and that he would not collect any pay from the team during the suspension.

Bailey signed a 5-year, $16.5 million contract with the Islanders on July 13, 2013.

During the 2017–18 season, Bailey scored his first career hat trick in a 4–6 loss to the Columbus Blue Jackets on December 14, 2017. Posting 18 goals and 53 assists for a career high 71 points, he was selected to his first NHL All-Star Game on January 10, 2018. On February 23, 2018, Bailey agreed to a six-year contract extension with the Islanders.

Bailey was named an alternate captain ahead of the 2018–19 season.

On April 10, 2019, Bailey scored his first playoff NHL overtime winner against the Pittsburgh Penguins. He scored his second overtime winner on May 24, 2021, again against the Penguins, on a turnover from Pittsburgh goaltender Tristan Jarry.

On October 28, 2022, Bailey played his 1,000th NHL game against the Carolina Hurricanes. He is only the third player from the Islanders to play all 1,000 games with the team.

International play
On April 16, 2018, Bailey replaced Vince Dunn on Team Canada's senior team at the 2018 IIHF World Championship.

Career statistics

Regular season and playoffs

International

References

External links
 

1989 births
Living people
Bridgeport Sound Tigers players
Canadian ice hockey right wingers
Ice hockey people from Ontario
National Hockey League All-Stars
National Hockey League first-round draft picks
New York Islanders draft picks
New York Islanders players
Owen Sound Attack players
SC Bietigheim-Bissingen players
Sportspeople from Clarington
Windsor Spitfires players